Savage Play is a 1995 New Zealand drama film directed by Alan Lindsay and starring Peter Bland, Paris Jefferson and featuring James Fleming. The screenplay concerns a young New Zealander searching for his father.

Plot summary
During a rugby tour of Britain and Ireland in 1888, a young New Zealander searches for his father who he has never met. While there he falls in love with the daughter of an aristocrat.

Cast
 Peter Bland ... Prince of Wales
 James Fleming ...  Wrestler
 Paris Jefferson ...  Violet
 Peter Kaa ...  Pony
 Rena Owen ...  Takiora
 Gavin Richards ...  Kim
 Ian Richardson ...  Count
 Martyn Sanderson ...  Henry
 Robin Thomson ...  Durham
 Liza Walker ...  Charlotta
 Piripi Waretini ...  Tabby

References

External links

1995 films
1995 drama films
Films directed by Alan Lindsay
New Zealand drama films
1990s English-language films